"God Whispered Your Name" is a song recorded by New Zealand-Australian country music singer Keith Urban. It was released on 2 March 2020 as the second single from Urban's eleventh studio album The Speed of Now Part 1.

Content
American Christian musician Chris August co-wrote the song with Shy Carter, Micah Carter, and James T. Slater. Urban co-produced with Dan McCarroll. Of the song, Urban told Nash Country Daily, "absolutely spoke to me and tells my journey in such a profound way going through a season in life of being very lost and lonely and confused and not knowing how to get out of that".

Jennifer Massaux directed the music video, which features Urban performing in a basement, from which he escapes to find a sunlit landscape. The basement scenes were filmed underneath a warehouse in Nashville, Tennessee, while the outside scenes were filmed in Lancaster, California.

Charts

Weekly charts

Year-end charts

Certifications

References

2020 singles
2020 songs
Keith Urban songs
Songs written by Shy Carter
Songs written by James T. Slater
Capitol Records Nashville singles